Harris Township is one of twenty-six townships in Fulton County, Illinois, USA.  As of the 2010 census, its population was 368 and it contained 179 housing units.

Geography

Cities, towns, villages
 Marietta
  * Seville (Only a number off houses exist)
 Vanapolis (no longer exists)
 Leaman
 Buckwheat
 Point Pleasant
 Williams
 Shoofly

Cemeteries
The township contains these two cemeteries: Marietta and Point Pleasant.

Major highways
  Illinois Route 95

Demographics

School districts
 Bushnell Prairie City Community Unit School District 170
 Community Unit School District 3 Fulton City
 V I T Community Unit School District 2

Political districts
 Illinois's 17th congressional district
 State House District 94
 State Senate District 47

References
 
 United States Census Bureau 2007 TIGER/Line Shapefiles
 United States National Atlas

External links
 City-Data.com
 Illinois State Archives

Townships in Fulton County, Illinois
Townships in Illinois